The Mazda6 (GJ/GL) is the third and current generation of the Mazda6. The sedan was unveiled during Moscow International Automobile Salon on 29 August 2012, and the station wagon version followed during the 2012 Paris Motor Show in the following month. In this generation, there are only 4-door sedan and 5-door station wagon versions available.

Overview
The design was previewed by both the Takeri concept, unveiled at the 2011 Tokyo Motor Show, and the Shinari concept from 2010.

Its design has been extremely well-received, and was a finalist in the 2013 "World Car Design of the Year".

In July 2019, the "Atenza" nameplate was renamed into Mazda6 moniker in the Japanese domestic market as part of Mazda's new global naming structure.

Markets

Asia
The Japanese-market Mazda Atenza went on sale from 1 November 2012. Early models included the 20S (sedan/wagon), 25S (sedan/wagon), XD (sedan/wagon), and XD L-package (sedan/wagon).

In China, the third generation was sold under the Atenza nameplate, to differentiate it from the first generation Mazda6 which was still being produced in China.

In the Philippines, under Mazda's local distributor Berjaya Auto Philippines, the third generation Mazda6 sedan went on-sale by the end of 2013 as a 2014 model year. It was followed by a 5-door station wagon variant, the Mazda6 Sports Wagon in late 2014 for the 2015 model year (with a diesel engine variant later on for 2016 to 2018). In October 2018, Mazda Philippines launched the facelifted Mazda6 sedan and wagon (with both diesel and gasoline variants) during the 7th Philippine International Motor Show.

2014 Tokyo Auto Salon concepts (2014)

The 2014 Atenza Sedan design concept was a Mazda Atenza Sedan with Skyactiv-D engine, Skyactiv-MT 6-speed transmission, original aero parts, Brembo brake calipers, Soul red body color, aluminum wheels, semi-bucket seats, and Alcantara interior upholstery.

The 2014 Atenza Wagon design concept was a Mazda Atenza Wagon with Skyactiv-D engine, Skyactiv-MT 6-speed transmission, metal-decorated instrument panel, dashboard with leather upholstery and stitching, and metal decoration at trunk board.

The vehicles were unveiled at the 2014 Tokyo Auto Salon.

Australia and New Zealand
The 5-door hatchback version of the first and second generation models is no longer available, in favour of sedan and wagon versions (both available in Sport, Touring, GT SP and Atenza trim). The only available transmission is Mazda's 6-speed Skyactiv-Drive automatic.

Europe
Germany is one of the European countries where the 6 was offered with all-wheel drive.

North America
The third-generation, 2014 Mazda6 was unveiled at the 2012 Los Angeles Auto Show. North American models with the Skyactiv-G 2.5-liter gasoline engine went on sale in January 2013; a V6 engine was no longer offered. US and Canadian models with the Skyactiv-D diesel engine available in Europe and Asia were originally planned for the second half of 2013, but that was delayed due to emissions issues. In 2014, the diesel engine was delayed again, effectively cancelling the program. 

The 2.5 L produced  and US EPA fuel economy ratings of  City and  Highway (with the 6-speed automatic).

In the United States, the Mazda6 was available only as a four-door sedan in three trims: Sport; Touring, and Grand Touring. Standard equipment included:

 2.5L, 184 horsepower Skyactiv-G I4
 Bluetooth hands-free telephone system with A2DP stereo streaming capabilities, on all models except the Sport with the 6-speed manual
 17-inch aluminum-alloy wheels
 Keyless entry with keyless access and push-button start system

The Sport and Touring trims were offered with the choice of either a 6-speed manual or 6-speed automatic transmission, while the top-of-the-line Grand Touring was available only with the automatic. In Canada, GX, GS and GT trim levels were offered; all had the manual transmission as standard equipment.

The Grand Touring model with Technology Package and Advanced Package added features such as radar cruise control, forward obstruction warning, lane departure warning, and automatic high beam control. For 2016, the Grand Touring introduced LED headlamps in lieu of the previous bi-xenon HIDs, new LED daytime running lights, and LED fog lights. The 2016 Grand Touring with Technology Package also introduced Smart Brake Support (SBS)—different from Smart City Brake Support (SCBS); the two systems perform different functions at different speed ranges.

The 2015 Mazda6 was named a Top Safety Pick Plus by the IIHS when equipped with available Smart City Brake Support. It was also named as a 2015 Car and Driver 10 Best pick, a "rare car that looks like it drives and drives like it looks."

In May 2021, Mazda announced it would discontinue the Mazda6 as well as the CX-3 in North America for the 2022 model year. Mazda cited shifting consumer preferences to larger crossover SUVs as the reasoning, adding that the similarly priced CX-5 outsells the Mazda6 by a margin of 9-to-1.

i-ELOOP
The North American 2014 Mazda6 Grand Touring trim with Technology Package introduced the Mazda i-ELOOP (intelligent-Energy Loop) technology. 
i-ELOOP is a regenerative engine braking system that uses the free wheeling alternator to capture energy when coasting.

The captured energy is stored in a capacitor, and that stored energy is then used to power the car's electrical components—from the AC to the power steering—and in turn, improves real–world fuel efficiency by as much as 5 percent. The i-ELOOP equipped cars, which also use active grill shutters at highway speeds, claim an EPA mileage rating of  City/ Highway, 2 mpg better EPA mileage ratings than the standard gasoline engine Mazda6 with 26/38. The capacitor can store in seconds enough energy to run the car electronics for several minutes. The capacitor system offers large weight and space savings over batteries. i-ELOOP also achieves better gas mileage by disengaging the alternator during acceleration.

Facelifts

2015
The first facelift made its European debut at the 2015 Geneva Motor Show, following its global debut at the 2014 Los Angeles Auto Show.

2018
A mid-cycle refresh for the 2018 Mazda6 was unveiled in November 2017 at the Los Angeles Auto Show. Changes to the 2018 Mazda6 include new front and rear fascias, new aluminum-alloy wheel designs, standard i-Activsense driver assistance technologies on all Mazda6 trim levels, new interior fabrics and upholsteries, and two new trim levels, Grand Touring Reserve and Signature. While the base Sport and Touring trims receive the previously-available , 2.5L Skyactiv I4 gasoline engine, the Grand Touring, Grand Touring Reserve, and Signature trims receive a 2.5L Skyactiv turbocharged I4 gasoline engine that produces  ( on high octane fuel). A six-speed automatic transmission is standard on all trim levels except the base Sport trim, while a six-speed manual transmission remains available only on the base Sport trim level. As before, the facelifted Mazda6 continues to be produced at Mazda's assembly plant in Hiroshima, Japan.

The 2018 Mazda6 was Mazda's first vehicle to receive both Apple CarPlay and Android Auto. A software update was available for 2018 Mazda6 owners that added these capabilities, and newer Mazda6 models are equipped with these features from the factory.

On some markets, the manual transmission was discontinued for the 2019 model year.

Special models

20th Anniversary
To commemorate the 20th anniversary of the Atenza/Mazda6 nameplate, Mazda released two special trims. The 20th Anniversary Edition would be available in Japan and Australia, and the Sports Appearance in Japan, both featuring new grille designs, side mirror caps, wheels and garnishes. New exclusive colors are also available, and a black Nappa leather interior has been added as an option. Performance has also been enhanced with improvements in power and torque and better pedal/steering feel.

Motorsport

In 2013, Mazda entered the new GX class of the Grand-Am Rolex Sports Car Series, with Mazda6 cars powered by its 2.2L diesel Skyactiv-D engine. During the first race at Rolex 24 At Daytona in January 2013, all three cars had to retire in the first few hours due to engine failure.  Mazda ultimately won the 2013 GX class championship, beating rivals Porsche and Lotus.  It was the only year for the class before the series rolled into the United (now WeatherTech) SportsCar Championship.

The Mazda6 is also presently used as a racing vehicle for the GTS class at SCCA Pro Racing World Challenge. Mazda finished first in the manufacturer's championship standings. Mazda6 drivers also finished first and second in the Touring Car driver points.

Takeri

The Mazda Takeri was a concept car made by Mazda. It was a preview of the GJ Mazda6. It was unveiled in 2011 at the Tokyo Motor Show.

References

External links
 Official website (United Kingdom)

All-wheel-drive vehicles
Cars introduced in 2012
2020s cars
Takeri
6M GJ